Kirk Langley is a civil parish in the Amber Valley district of Derbyshire, England.  The parish contains 18 listed buildings that are recorded in the National Heritage List for England.  Of these, one is listed at Grade I, the highest of the three grades, and the others are at Grade II, the lowest grade.  The parish contains the village of Kirk Langley and the surrounding countryside.  Most of the listed buildings are houses and associated structures, and farmhouses.  The other listed buildings include a church, a cross in the churchyard, a memorial hall, a boundary post, and a milepost.


Key

Buildings

References

Citations

Sources

 

Lists of listed buildings in Derbyshire